Edward Price may refer to:

 Edward Dean Price (1919–1997), U.S. federal judge
 Edward William Price (1832–1893), Australian civil servant, Government Resident of the Northern Territory
 Reynolds Price (Edward Reynolds Price, 1933–2011), American writer and professor
 Edward G. Price, Canadian political candidate
 Eddie Price (1925–1979), American football player
 Eddie Price III (born 1953), American politician, mayor of Mandeville, Louisiana
 Edward Price (Medal of Honor) (1840–?), American Civil War sailor and Medal of Honor recipient
 Edward W. Price (engineer) (1920–2012), American rocket engineer
 Ned Price (born 1982), U.S. State Department Spokesperson, former official of the CIA 
 Ted Price (footballer) (1883–1967), English football goalkeeper
 Edward Price (priest) (1770–1832), Archdeacon of Killaloe

See also
 Ed Price (disambiguation)
 Ted Price (born 1968), President and CEO of Insomniac Games, Inc.